Achéron was a French Navy  of the M6 ​​series commissioned in 1932. She participated in World War II, first on the side of the Allies from 1939 to June 1940, then in the navy of Vichy France. She was scuttled in November 1942.

Characteristics

Achéron was part of a fairly homogeneous series of 31 deep-sea patrol submarines also called "1,500-tonners" because of their displacement. All entered service between 1931 and 1939.

They displaced  on the surface and  underwater. When submerged, their two electric motors produced a combined  and allowed them to reach .

Construction and commissioning

Laid down at Ateliers et Chantiers de la Loire in Saint-Nazaire, France, on 4 or 24 September 1927 with the hull number Q150, Achéron was launched on 6 August 1929. She was commissioned on 22 February 1932.

Service history

World War II

French Navy
At the start of World War II in September 1939, Achéron was assigned to the 3rd Submarine Division in the 2nd Squadron — a component of the 1st Flotilla — based at Toulon, France. Her sister ships , Fresnel, and  made up the rest of the division. Agosta and Béveziers, which were returning to France from the French West Indies, also joined in the search.

At the beginning of February 1940, the 3rd Submarine Division transferred briefly to Casablanca in French Morocco and on 6 February 1940 began patrols off the Canary Islands, where the Allies believed that German cargo ships had taken refuge at the beginning of the war and were serving as supply ships for German U-boats. Crewmen from Achéron boarded the ship and determined that she was the British merchant ship , after which Achéron allowed her to proceed.

On 12 April 1940, the 3rd Submarine Division was transferred to the Mediterranean Sea, based first at Bizerte in Tunisia. While Fresnel remained at Bizerte, the division′s other submarines then transferred to Beirut in the French Mandate for Syria and Lebanon, from which they operated under the command of the British Commander-in-Chief, Mediterranean Fleet, Admiral Andrew Cunningham at Alexandria, Egypt. Achéron patrolled in the Eastern Mediterranean in the approaches to Beirut.

German ground forces advanced into France on 10 May 1940, beginning the Battle of France, and Italy declared war on France on 10 June 1940 and joined the invasion. On 16 June 1940, an Italian torpedo boat fired a torpedo at Achéron, but missed.

The Battle of France ended in France's defeat and an armistice with Germany and Italy, which went into effect on 25 June 1940. Achéron — by then assigned to the 3rd Submarine Division in the 3rd Squadron in the 1st Flotilla — was recalled to Beirut.

Vichy France
After France's surrender,  served in the naval forces of Vichy France. Her batteries and those of her sister ship  — which also was at Beirut — were in poor condition, but repairing or replacing them was impossible at Beirut. Escorted by the netlayer , the two submarines departed Beirut on 16 October 1940 bound for Toulon, which they reached on 24 October 1940. At Toulon, Achéron was placed under guard and maintained in a disarmed and unfueled state in accordance with the terms of the Armistice of 22 June 1940.

Loss
Achéron was at Toulon when Germany and Italy occupied the Free Zone of Vichy France on 27 November 1942, and she was among the French vessels scuttled at Toulon to prevent their seizure by Germany when German forces entered the naval base that day, sinking in Dock No. 3 of the Vauban Grand Docks.

The Germans seized Achéron and handed her over to the Italians for scrapping. Her wreck lay in a position where her stern hindered the closing of Dock No. 3, so divers cut her stern. The Italians refloated her on 26 June 1943, but she was still at Toulon when Italy surrendered to the Allies on 9 September 1943. The Germans seized her and earmarked her for scrapping, but 88 American bombers dropped  of bombs on the Toulon Arsenal and sank her on 24 November 1943 before she could be scrapped.

References

Citations

Bibliography

 
 
 
 

Redoutable-class submarines (1928)
1929 ships
Ships built in France
World War II submarines of France
Maritime incidents in November 1942
Maritime incidents in November 1943
World War II warships scuttled at Toulon
Lost submarines of France
Shipwrecks of France
Naval ships of France captured by Italy during World War II